Nemunas Rokiskis was an ice hockey team in Rokiskis, Lithuania. They played in the Lithuania Hockey League from 1993 to 2000.

History
The club finished in 4th place in the Lithuania Hockey League in 1994 and sixth place in 1995. From 1996-1998, Rokiskis finished third in the regular season and competed in the third place game in all three years. They won the third place game in 1997. In 1999, they finished second in the regular season and defeated Poseidonas Elektrenai in the third place game. Their last appearance in the Lithuania Hockey League came during the 1999–00 season, where they finished in third place.

Season-by-season results

References

External links
Team profile on eurohockey.com

Ice hockey teams in Lithuania